Lezhë railway station serves the town of Lezhë in northwest Albania.

The line was opened in 1981. It was a terminal station until the extension to Shkodër was completed the following year. Like most other railway stations in Albania, Lezhë has become underused since the rise in private car ownership following the  end of the communist regime in the 1990s.

Lezhë is one of the larger, more substantial stations on the line, and formerly had a number of facilities; it once had a bar, which was privatised in 1993.

In 2013, the Municipality of Lezhë announced a plan to build a large new business park in the city, which would include a new, improved freight facility for the station, though it is unclear whether this plan will be carried out.

References

Railway stations in Albania
Railway stations opened in 1981